Sarah Macdonald may refer to:

Sarah MacDonald (musician), Canadian-born organist and conductor, living in the UK
Sarah Macdonald (journalist), Australian journalist, author and radio presenter
Sarah MacDonald, a character in the TV series The River played by Katy Murphy